The Spacecraft Fabrication Facility is a unit at the Goddard Space Flight Center where technicians and engineers manufacture components used for spacecraft assembly. This includes the tools which the astronauts use in space as well as the spacecraft themselves.

Branches
The Mission Engineering and Systems Analysis Branch is broken up into seven smaller branches:
 GN&C Systems Engineering Branch
 Systems Engineering Services and Advanced Concepts Branch
 Flight Dynamics Analysis Branch
 Component Hardware Systems Branch
 Propulsion Branch - The Propulsion branch is responsible for the spacecraft propulsion subsystems design, fabrication, analysis, integration, testing, propellant loading, and launch. LRO is one of the current missions.
 GN&C Mission Systems Engineering Branch
 Mission Systems Engineering Branch

External links
 NASA: Goddard's Organizations and Projects

NASA groups, organizations, and centers